Lindberg is a common European surname. Literally translated it means lime OR LINDEN tree - mountain. It originally comes from villages in Germany, Austria and Switzerland and is now very common in Sweden.

Geographical distribution
As of 2014, 52.9% of all known bearers of the surname Lindberg were residents of Sweden, 26.6% of the United States, 7.3% of Finland, 4.5% of Denmark, 3.4% of Norway and 1.9% of Canada.

In Sweden, the frequency of the surname was higher than national average (1:354) in the following counties:
 1. Västerbotten (1:122)
 2. Gävleborg (1:178)
 3. Norrbotten (1:244)
 4. Uppsala (1:258)
 5. Västmanland (1:264)
 6. Dalarna (1:293)
 7. Jämtland (1:319)
 8. Västernorrland (1:319)
 9. Södermanland (1:347)

In Finland, the frequency of the surname was higher than national average (1:1,441) in the following regions:
 1. Åland (1:336)
 2. Southwest Finland (1:730)
 3. Uusimaa (1:849)
 4. Tavastia Proper (1:1,202)
 5. Kymenlaakso (1:1,285)  

In the United States, the frequency of the surname was higher than national average (1:25,889) in the following states:

 1. Minnesota (1:2,886)
 2. North Dakota (1:5,623)
 3. Wyoming (1:7,249)
 4. Washington (1:7,391)
 5. Montana (1:7,443)
 6. South Dakota (1:9,169)
 7. Wisconsin (1:9,794)
 8. Vermont (1:11,445)
 9. Oregon (1:13,115)
 10. Alaska (1:14,169)
 11. Idaho (1:15,505)
 12. Massachusetts (1:18,030)
 13. Illinois (1:18,160)
 14. Utah (1:18,608)
 15. Rhode Island (1:18,664)
 16. Kansas (1:19,262)
 17. Connecticut (1:19,699)
 18. Michigan (1:20,983)
 19. Colorado (1:21,261)
 20. Iowa (1:22,068)
 21. New Hampshire (1:22,808)
 22. Nebraska (1:22,893)
 23. Arizona (1:23,616)
 24. New Mexico (1:23,808)

People

A–G
 Anna Lindberg (born 1981), Swedish diver
 Augusta Lindberg (1866–1943), Swedish actress
 Carl Lindberg (1904–1984), Danish boxer
 Chad Lindberg (born 1976), American actor
 Charles W. Lindberg (1920–2007), United States Marine, one of the raisers of the U.S. flag at Iwo Jima
 Chris Lindberg (born 1967), retired Canadian ice hockey player
 Christian Lindberg (born 1958), Swedish trombonist
 Christina Lindberg (born 1950), Swedish actress and pin-up girl
 David C. Lindberg (1935–2015), American historian of science
 David R. Lindberg (born 1948), American malacologist
 Dawn Lindberg (1945–2020), South African singer and actress
 Donald A.B. Lindberg (1933–2019), U.S. physician
 Edward Lindberg (1887–1978), U.S. Olympic athlete
 Elsa Lindberg-Dovlette (1874–1944), Swedish writer and princess of Persia
 Gunner Lindberg (born 1975), convicted U.S. murderer

H–M
 Hanna Lindberg (1865–1951), Swedish politician, the first woman in a communal council (1910)
 Hans Lindberg (born 1981), Danish team handball player
 Helge Lindberg (1887–1928), Finnish opera singer
 Janne Lindberg (born 1966), Finnish former professional footballer
 Jim Lindberg (born 1968), U.S. singer-songwriter for the punk band Pennywise
 John Lindberg (born 1959), American jazz double-bassist
 John G. Lindberg (1884–1973), Finnish ophthalmologist, discoverer of exfoliation syndrome (1917)
 Karin Lindberg (1929–2020), Swedish gymnast
 Karin Kock-Lindberg (1891–1976), Swedish politician
 Knut Lindberg (1882–1961), Swedish Olympic athlete
 Knut Lindberg (wrestler) (1880–1930), Finnish wrestler
 Kristoffer Lindberg (born 1992), Swedish politician
 Magnus Lindberg (born 1958), Finnish composer
 Marcus Lindberg (born 1980), Swedish footballer
 Marie Lindberg (cyclist) (born 1987), Swedish road cyclist
 Marie Lindberg (singer) (born 1975), Swedish teacher, singer/songwriter and guitarist
 Morten Lindberg (1965–2019), also known as Master Fatman, Danish media personality

N–Z
 Odd F. Lindberg (1945–2021), Norwegian freelance journalist, arctic explorer and film maker
 Oskar Lindberg (composer) (1887–1955), Swedish composer
 Oskar Lindberg (cross-country skier) (1894–1977), Swedish cross-country skier
 Patrik Lindberg (born 1988), better known as f0rest, Swedish Counter-Strike player
 Sextus Otto Lindberg (1835–1889), Swedish physician and bryologist
 Sigfrid Lindberg (1897–1977), Swedish footballer
 Sven Lindberg (1918–2006), Swedish film actor and director
 Stig Lindberg (1916–1982), Swedish ceramic designer, glass designer, textile designer, industrial designer, painter, and illustrator
 Teres Lindberg (born 1974), Swedish politician
 Tomas Lindberg (born 1972), Swedish singer
 Torsten Lindberg (1917–2009), Swedish football player and manager
 Ulrika Knape-Lindberg (born 1955), Swedish diver, mother of Anna Lindberg
 Verner Lindberg (1852–1909), Finnish politician
 Ylva Lindberg (born 1976), Swedish ice hockey player

See also
 Lindbergh (disambiguation)
 Leopold Lindtberg (1902–1984), Austrian Swiss film and theatre director

References

Swedish-language surnames
German-language surnames